Elliot Cahn is an American singer, guitarist, entertainment attorney, and personal music manager best known for being one of the founding members of the Doo-wop group, Sha Na Na (1969–1973).   As an entertainment attorney he has represented such artists as The Offspring, Papa Roach, and Rancid and was the personal manager of the band, Green Day, among others.

Career
Cahn was one of Sha Na Na's founding members while attending Columbia University with a group of students who shared an interest in harmonies inspired by 1950s doo-wop groups.  The band performed at Woodstock in 1969 (after being invited to perform by Jimi Hendrix) and appeared in the Oscar winning film, Woodstock (film) in 1970, as well.  Cahn performed on Sha Na Na's live recorded album, The Golden Age of Rock n' Roll, with record sales exceeding 500,000 copies.

In 1995, Cahn and Jeff Saltzman launched 510 Records, a joint venture with MCA Records, signing Dance Hall Crashers, among others.

References

Musikladen (Director). (2020, October 16). Lovers Never Say Goodbye, Bowzer, Gino, and Sha Na Na, 1973 [Video file]. Retrieved April 18, 2022, from https://m.youtube.com/watch?v=LLmQUYJu7B4

Living people
20th-century American lawyers
21st-century American lawyers
American entertainment lawyers
American male singers
American male guitarists
Year of birth missing (living people)
Columbia College (New York) alumni
UC Berkeley School of Law alumni